Upper Staploe is a hamlet located in the Borough of Bedford in the county of Bedfordshire, England. The settlement is close to Honeydon and Staploe, and forms part of the Staploe civil parish. Upper Staploe lies close to the county border with the Huntingdonshire district of Cambridgeshire.

References

Hamlets in Bedfordshire
Borough of Bedford